The Bahrain national football team represents Bahrain in international football and is controlled by the Bahrain Football Association, which was founded in 1951 and joined FIFA in 1966. They have never reached the World Cup, but have twice come within one match of doing so. Bahrain won the FIFA's most improved team award in 2004, and finished fourth in the 2004 Asian Cup, beating Uzbekistan in the quarter-finals but losing to Japan in the semi-finals 4–3. Bahrain then lost to Iran in the third-place match, thus finishing in fourth place overall. Bahrain had a golden year in 2019, winning both the WAFF Championship and the Arabian Gulf Cup for the first time, under the stewardship of Hélio Sousa.

History

Early time
Even though the first national team was founded in 1959, Bahraini team was only first officially assembled in 1966 where they played a friendly game against Kuwait, where they drew 4–4. At that time, despite being under British rule, Bahrain was given autonomy and they had utilized this opportunity to expand its football development. Nonetheless, Bahrain was regarded as a weaker side in the Gulf Arab region, which constituted the stronger Saudi Arabia, Qatar, UAE and Kuwait. For this reason, Bahrain's international feat had been mostly limited in the Arabian Gulf Cup.

In 1988, Bahrain qualified to its first ever AFC Asian Cup, but finished bottom with only two draws in the 1988 AFC Asian Cup. Since then, Bahraini side remained neglected and less invested, despite its youth successes at the U-17 and U-20. Only by the end of the 20th century, Bahrain began to really emerge and would change the country's football history.

Rise
Bahrain managed a fine performance during 2000 AFC Asian Cup qualification and 2002 FIFA World Cup qualification, the latter was the first time Bahrain reached the final round. Despite being unable to reach either of them, Bahrain managed one of their greatest football feats, by beating Iran in both qualifications 1–0 in Damascus in 2000 Asian Cup run, and 3–1 at home in 2002 World Cup run, which remains one of the most embarrassing defeats for Iranian football. This win, though mean less for Bahrain, did manage to pull Iran out from reaching a direct World Cup ticket and helped Saudi Arabia to qualify for 2002 FIFA World Cup, Iran later failed to qualify; Bahraini fans had waged Saudi flag as a response of this win, fueling tensions between Bahrain and Iran.

2004 Asian Cup
The form of Bahrain in 2004 AFC Asian Cup was a complete stunning for many. In their just second appearance, Bahrain was drawn with mighty host China, neighbor Qatar and Southeast Asia's finest Indonesia. However, Bahrain went on undefeated at the group stage, including a famous 2–2 draw to China in Beijing, 1–1 to Qatar before trashed Indonesia 3–1 to reach the quarter-finals for the first time. Then, Bahrain overcame Uzbekistan on penalty shootout in the quarter-finals, having been held 2–2. Bahrain put up another astonishing performance against defending champions Japan, only lost 3–4 after extra time, before losing 2–4 to Iran in the third place game. This tournament would mark the rise of Bahrain as a serious competitor for football in Asia.

2006 World Cup
After Uzbekistan and Bahrain both finished third in their respective groups during the 2006 World Cup qualifiers, Bahrain entered a two-legged playoff with Uzbekistan, which they won on away goals with an aggregate score of 1–1. This allowed Bahrain to enter another two-legged playoff with the fourth-placed CONCACAF nation, (Trinidad and Tobago), for a spot in the World Cup. But a 0–1 Bahrain loss in Manama after a 1–1 draw in Port of Spain saw the CONCACAF nation go through as debutant.

2007 Asian Cup
Bahrain played in group D in the 2007 AFC Asian Cup qualification group games. Bahrain fielded a side which was essentially the Olympic (under 23) team against Australia, and they lost 2–0. Bahrain qualified for the 2007 Asian Cup after defeating Kuwait in their last match. Bahrain were knocked out in the group stage via two losses against Indonesia and Saudi Arabia, despite a shock win against Korea Republic.

2010 World Cup

In the third round of the 2010 World Cup qualifiers, Bahrain were drawn into group B along with Japan, Oman, and Thailand. They finished second overall to qualify to the final round, in which Bahrain finished third overall in their group, below Australia and Japan, but above Uzbekistan and Qatar. In the second leg of the playoff against Saudi Arabia to decide Asia's fifth best team, Bahrain drew 2–2 with Saudi Arabia after scoring in stoppage time which allowed them to go through on away goals, after drawing their home leg 0–0. They went on to play New Zealand in the final playoff in which a victory would qualify them for the World Cup, but after a goalless draw in Manama on 10 October 2009, Bahrain lost the return leg 1–0 in Wellington on 14 November 2009, missing out on qualification at the last hurdle for the second time running.

Crisis period

2011 Asian Cup
Bahrain qualified for the 2011 AFC Asian Cup held in neighbouring Qatar, and was drawn in a tough group composing Australia, South Korea and India. Bahrain faced its first task to overcome South Korea, with the hope to repeat the surprise 2–1 victory of the 2007 edition, but South Korea turned the deficit to beat Bahrain with the same score. After the loss, Bahrain cruised past India in a seven-goal party, Bahrain scored five to keep its hope alive; but its campaign ended in vain when they lost to Australia 0–1 and was dismissed from the group stages.

2014 World Cup

In the 2014 FIFA World Cup qualifiers, Bahrain did considerably worse. In the third round, they were drawn against Indonesia, Iran and Qatar. Although they managed to defeat Indonesia both home and away, they also lost 6–0 by Iran away from home, and drew their other 3 games. Although they had a higher goal difference than Qatar, they needed an extra point to advance to the next round, or Qatar had to be beaten by Iran in the final round. If they had also drawn to Iran away from home, they would have advanced. But neither luck came to them, and their campaign ended in the third round, their worst result since the 1998 World Cup qualifiers.

2015 Asian Cup
The 2015 AFC Asian Cup once again became a disappointment for the Bahrainis, even though their group was easier, with only Iran being the biggest opponent while the UAE and Qatar were no strangers. Bahrain lost two opening games against Iran and the UAE 0–2 and 1–2, the latter defeat was subject to the earliest goal in Asian Cup history by Ali Mabkhout. Bahrain salvaged some pride with a 2–1 win over Qatar, condemning its neighbour to bottom of the group while Bahrain finished third for the second consecutive Asian Cup.

2018 World Cup and 2019 Asian Cup qualifications
In the 2018 FIFA World Cup qualifiers second round, Bahrain finished fourth in a group with Uzbekistan, North Korea, Philippines and Yemen. The poor performance of the Bahraini side caused huge public uproar over the team's ongoing decline, rocked the chair of manager Sergio Batista. He was eventually sacked and replaced by Czech youth coach Miroslav Soukup, who decided to revamp the team.

Later on, Bahrain participated in the 2019 AFC Asian Cup qualification, where finished first in the third round in a group with Turkmenistan, Chinese Taipei and Singapore, to qualify to the next AFC Asian Cup. However, the team's performance was far from perfect. The team suffered a home draw to minnows Singapore, before getting humiliated by Chinese Taipei away 1–2 that was considered as a shock, since Taiwan is not a football nation. This defeat also prompted Bahrain's main star, Ismail Abdullatif, to retire from the team.

Bahrain managed some promising performance during this deteriorating era, reaching semi-finals of the 23rd Arabian Gulf Cup held in Kuwait.

Short-lived glory

2019: Asian Cup; WAFF Championship and Gulf Cup champions 
At the 2019 AFC Asian Cup, Bahrain was grouped with India, Thailand and hosts United Arab Emirates. The Bahrainis managed a promising early performance when they faced the hosts, scored a goal lead in 78', but was eventually held 1–1 following an unclear penalty decision by the Jordanian referee Adham Makhadmeh. However, Bahrain suffered a blasting loss to Thailand 0–1, leaving the team flounder despite its earlier performance. In the final match against India, which the Indians only required a draw to progress, Bahrain however managed to get a needed penalty in injury time, where Jamal Rashid turned hero as Bahrain won the fixture 1–0 to seal the team into the knockout stage for the only second times ever, and eliminated the Indians from the competition. The Bahraini side then played its own round of sixteen match, where they lost 2–1 to South Korea after extra time. This was considered as a major success for Bahraini football, and also to be the end of the country's football misfortune that endured since 2010s.

Afterwards, Bahrain managed to win two competitions for the first time, after defeating both Iraq and Saudi Arabia, 1–0 under the leadership of Hélio Sousa against all odds, in the WAFF Championship and Gulf Cup respectively.

2022 World Cup
Bahrain defeated Iran 1–0 in the 2022 FIFA World Cup Qualification Round 2, delivering a major upset in the qualifying process, and with Bahrain enjoying huge edge in the qualifiers, Bahrain was expected to reach the third round. However, due to COVID-19 pandemic, Bahrain's great progression in 2019 was reversed when it lost significant home supports (despite being designated as hosts for the remaining games) due to pandemic, as fans were barred from attending, Iran having replaced manager as well, combining the Bahrain's domestic league under frequent disruption due to the pandemic, all left Bahraini players little time to organise their team. Bahrain triumphed against Cambodia 8–0 in their first game since the pandemic began, but against an Iranian side that was entirely revamped, a Bahraini side without home support was completely demoralised, losing 0–3 in process. This defeat proved to be disastrous for Bahrain, as their 4–0 victory over Hong Kong was too little, too late, due to Iran prevailing 1–0 over Iraq in the final game.

Team image

Rivalries

Qatar 
Bahrain has a major rivalry against Qatar due to historical tension between the two countries. Through 39 matches played between the teams, Bahrain has an overall positive performance against Qatar, winning eleven matches, lost eight matches while nineteen matches ended in a draw.

Kit providers

Results and fixtures

Matches in the last 12 months, and future scheduled matches

2022

2023

Current staff

Coaching history

Caretaker managers are listed in italics.

 Jassim Al-Maawada and  Abdul-Salam Alam (1966)
 Hamada El-Sharqawi (1970–1974)
 Danny McLennan (1974–1975)
 Adnan Ayoub and  Khalifa AlHamdan (1975)
 Jack Mansell (1976)
 Mal Thompson and Michael Gorman (1979)
 Ljubiša Broćić (1979–1981)
 Farouq Ahmed Ali (1981)
 Sebastião Pereira de Araújo (1982–1984, 1992–1993)
 Keith Burkinshaw (1984–1986)
 Robbie Stepney (1986–1987)
 Abdelmajid Chetali (1988)
 Mohamed Al-Arabi Al-Zouaui (1988)
 Uli Maslo (1990–1992)
 Adnan Ayoub (1992)
 Ivan Katalinić (1994)
 Victor Stănculescu (1995–1996)
 Fuad Boshqar (1996)
 Josef Hickersberger (1997)
 Ernesto Rosa Guedes (1998)
 Alexandru Moldovan (1999)
 Salman Sharida (2000)
 Wolfgang Sidka (2001–2002, 2005)
 Yves Herbet (2003)
 Srećko Juričić (2003–2005)
 Luka Peruzović (2005–2006)
 Riyadh Al-Thawadi (2006)
 Hans-Peter Briegel (2006–2007)
 Senad Kreso (2007)
 Milan Máčala (2008–2010)
 Josef Hickersberger (2010)
 Marjan Eid (2010)
 Salman Sharida (2010–2011)
 Peter Taylor (2011–2012)
 Gabriel Calderón (2012–2013)
 Anthony Hudson (2013–2014)
 Adnan Hamad (2014)
 Marjan Eid (2014–2015)
 Sergio Batista (2015–2016)
 Miroslav Soukup (2016–2019)
 Hélio Sousa (2019–present)

Players

Current squad
 The following players were called up for the 25th Arabian Gulf Cup.
 Match dates: 6 – 19 January 2023
 Opposition: ,  and 
Caps and goals correct as of: 18 November 2022, after the match against

Recent call-ups
The following players have been called up for the team in the last 12 months.

INJ Withdrew due to injury
PRE Preliminary squad / standby
RET Retired from the national team
SUS Serving suspension
WD Player withdrew from the squad due to non-injury issue.

Records

Players in bold are still active with Bahrain.

Most capped players

Top goalscorers

Competitive record

FIFA World Cup

AFC Asian Cup

Gulf Cup

FIFA Arab Cup

Asian Games

Pan Arab Games

WAFF Championship record

Head-to-head record
As of 18 November 2022 after match against .

Honours

Continental
AFC Asian Cup:
Fourth place: 2004

Regional
Arabian Gulf Cup:
Champions: 2019
Runners-up: 1970, 1982, 1992, 2003
Third place:  1990, 1994, 2004

WAFF Championship:
Champions: 2019
Third place: 2014

Pan Arab Games
Gold medalists: 2011

Arab Cup:
Runners-up: 1985, 2002

References

External links

Bahrain Football Association official website
Bahrain FIFA profile

 
Asian national association football teams